Ingenting may refer to:
"Ingenting" (single), a 2007 single CD by the band Kent
Ingenting (album), a 2002 bob Hund album